Flat Top Manor, as it is most commonly known, is also called the Moses Cone Manor, Moses Cone Estate, and the Moses H. Cone Mansion. It is at Milepost 294 of the Blue Ridge Parkway in Blowing Rock, North Carolina. It was built by American textile entrepreneur Moses H. Cone for his home and based on the idea of replicating George Vanderbilt's Biltmore Estate, the largest privately owned house in the United States. He used his estate to showcase his knowledge of scientific farming and to represent his wealth he had accumulated.

The manor mansion and associated property was donated to the National Park Service and they managed it. The house is referred to as the Parkway Craft Center to those that travel the Blue Ridge Parkway. The Craft Center has a gift shop and a workshop where various arts and crafts are demonstrated. There are tours given by Park Rangers of the second story of the mansion and there are self-guiding trails on the property where a visitor can hike.

History
The Flat Top Manor mansion was built by Moses H. Cone and his wife Bertha at the turn of the 20th century. Its construction was started in 1899 and finished in 1901. Moses was a textile entrepreneur in the eastern and southern United States. He was one of the largest producers of the denim fabric in the world, becoming known as The Denim King and was a major supplier to Levi Strauss and Company for a hundred years.

Moses announced in 1898 that he was going to build a mansion that would cost over 100 times what it would cost to purchase for a habitable home in the area, which was between $100 and $200 at the time. The mansion he built ultimately cost $60,000 before it was finished. His intention was to emulate George Vanderbilt’s Biltmore Estate in Asheville, North Carolina. Newspaper reporters of the time referred to these house builders as 'Farmer Cone' and 'Farmer Vanderbilt.'

Location and layout

The mansion, designed by architect Orlo Epps, is named 'Flat Top' Manor because of the nearness the property that Moses and Bertha purchased is to Flat Top Mountain. The land they acquired for the mansion is part of the Blue Ridge Mountains and goes from Flat Top Mountain across the valley to Rich Mountain. Moses used his estate to showcase his knowledge of scientific farming. The Cones also established a school, a church, and residences for their employees.

The property has 12 structures and was equipped with servants' quarters, stables, and milking barns. The property was planted with apple orchards with different varieties of apples that matured from early summer until late fall. Nearby was an artificial lake stocked with bass. A newly created lake was stocked with trout. There were also prize-winning cattle and sheep that pastured on the manor land. A fence was constructed that surrounded a chestnut forest which was stocked with deer.

There was a single lane bowling alley located in a 864 square foot rectangular board-and batten separate building built on the knoll behind the main house. Cone purchased 931 square feet of Number 1 alley stock which was a maple flooring that cost $37.24. The first ball was rolled August 1900. Only men used the bowling alley, they would roll the ball down the lane and have to walk down the lane themselves to retrieve the ball and set the pins back up. To stop the ball a large bear skin hung on the back wall.

Landscaping at the manor involved flower and vegetable gardens. All this landscaping and gardening involved a crew of half a dozen men. Cone did scientific apple growing in addition that involved some 32,000 apple trees in four orchards. These were spread out over three hundred acres. He had tenants mow and keep the groves clean and trimed.

Architecture

The manor has frequently been described as an example of Colonial Revival architecture, however a professional architectural study determined that this classification is inaccurate. The architects determined that Flat Top Manor is an example of Beaux-Arts design. At the turn of the twentieth century, constructing the mansion that had gaslights, a telephone, and central heating system was not an easy task. This was the way all the fine furnishings and decorative items were brought in also to the mansion.

Legacy 
The Moses H. Cone Memorial Park that contains the mansion and associated property is located between Milepost 292 and 295 of the Blue Ridge Parkway. The mountain holdings of the Flat Top Manor was maintained by Moses' wife Bertha for 39 years after Moses died in 1908 until she died in 1947. It then passed to the Cone Memorial Hospital in Greensboro and shortly thereafter they donated it to the United States Park Service, who has maintained it since. The mansion is a contributing property on the National Register of Historic Places Program (NRHP) listing for the Flat Top Estate (NRHP name for the Memorial Park). There are four buildings constructed by the Cones that survive into the twenty-first century which include the Flat Top Manor mansion, the Carriage House, the Apple Barn, and the Sandy Flat Missionary Baptist Church.

The house is open to the public and there is no charge for admission. The first floor contains a Craft Center operated by the Southern Highland Handicraft Guild. It also has a National Park Service information desk and a book store. There are tours given by Park Rangers of the second story of the mansion. A visitor can sit in a rocking chair on the large veranda or walk the nearby self-guiding trail to the side of the manor house. The hike around Bass Lake is the most popular. There are twenty-one miles of carriage drives for visitors that meander throughout the property that go through forest plantations, flowering shrub areas, meadows, pastures, orchards, and along stream corridors that have stone-lined pools, falls, and lakes.

The Craft Center inside the mansion features a gift shop and a craft-person's workshop where various arts and crafts (i.e. pottery, wood carving, textiles, painting, drawing, needlepoint, crocheting) are demonstrated often. To most people who travel the Parkway the Cone Manor is simply the Parkway Craft Center, which is the major component of the manor house. It is open to the public from spring through fall and gets over 250,000 visitors annually.

References

Sources

External links 
Google map location
Parkway Craft Center demonstrations
Blue Ridge Parkway Foundation virtual tour

Houses in Watauga County, North Carolina
Cone family
Historic house museums in North Carolina
Museums in Watauga County, North Carolina
Sculpture gardens, trails and parks in the United States
Houses completed in 1901
Landmarks in North Carolina
Appalachian culture in North Carolina
Colonial Revival architecture in North Carolina
Articles containing video clips